Disney's Cinderella is an animated feature film based on the fairy tale story of the same name released in 1950. Two sequels released on DVD over 50 years later: Cinderella II: Dreams Come True (2002) and Cinderella III: A Twist in Time (2007). Main characters introduced in the first film include the titular Cinderella, her stepmother, two stepsisters, fairy godmother, and her love interest Prince Charming. Both the first sequel and the live action 2015 film introduced new characters into the story.

Main characters

Cinderella

Cinderella is a young orphan character with medium-length blonde hair, blue eyes and a fair complexion. There are many different stories about her from various states and countries.

After her father dies, she is forced into servitude in her own home and is constantly tormented by her evil stepmother, Lady Tremaine, and two stepsisters, Anastasia and Drizella. Despite this, she maintains hope through her dreams and remains a kind, gentle and sweet person. She has faith that someday her dreams of happiness will come true and her kindness will be repaid. Cinderella is shown to have a down-to-earth attitude, but she is also a daydreamer. For example, in "Sing Sweet Nightingale", she becomes distracted with the bubbles, allowing Lucifer the cat to smudge the floor she was cleaning. Also, after hearing that the Grand Duke is traveling the kingdom with the missing slipper, she dreamily dances back to the attic humming the song she heard at the ball. She is also shown to have a sarcastic side and a sharp wit.

With the help of her animal friends, she fixes up an old dress of her mother's so she can attend a royal ball. However, when her evil stepsisters brutally tear the dress apart, she is heartbroken and fears that her dreams will never come true.

However, her Fairy Godmother (a fairy with magical powers) appears, restoring Cinderella's hope by transforming her torn homemade gown into her now-iconic silver (powder blue in the shadows) ball gown with a glittering puffed over-skirt, a delicate laced white petticoat and puffy sleeves. She wears her hair in a French twist supported by a silver headband and her accessories include silver opera gloves, a black choker, and glass slippers. As a servant, she wears her hair down in a ponytail, sometimes supported by a white scarf and wears a brown dress with a powder blue blouse, a white apron, and black flats.

She was voiced by Ilene Woods in the original film and later Jennifer Hale in the sequels.

In the 2015 live-action film, Ella was the character's original name, Cinderella was instead a spiteful nickname given by the stepsisters to Ella after she slept near the fireplace and subsequently covered by cinder (ash). In the film, Eloise Webb portrayed the 10-year old Ella in the prologue, with Lily James portrayed the older Ella.

Jaq and Gus

Jaq (real name Jacques) and Gus (real name Octavius) are two mice who serve as Cinderella's sidekicks. Gus has a penchant for cheese.

In the first film, Cinderella rescues the mice from traps and the cat Lucifer and dresses and feeds them. They perform many favors in return. Jaq seems to be one of the leaders of the mice, planning strategies to avoid the cat, sneak food, and help Cinderella with her ball gown. The other mice gladly follow his lead. Jaq is thin, with scruffy hair, and speaks a fast kind of pidgin English. Gus appears in the first scene of the film, trapped shivering in a cage where Jaq finds him and brings Cinderella to rescue him. Cinderella names him "Octavius," and calls him "Gus" for short. This is an example of an inside joke among the writers and (some) viewers of the movie. Gus is actually short for Augustus. In ancient Rome, Octavius was renamed Augustus when he became emperor. Hence Octavius - Augustus - Gus. Jaq explains the situation to Gus, that Cinderella wants to help him, and Gus catches on and joins the mouse troop. Gus has a large belly that pokes out of his yellow shirt and seems to be a bit slow on the pickup, but brave in a pinch, and speaks even more broken English than Jaq, who calls him "Gus-Gus".

Jaq and Gus are two of four mice that the Fairy Godmother transforms into stallions so that Cinderella can attend the ball, but at the stroke of midnight, they are transformed back into mice. Later, Jaq and Gus are responsible for stealing the key to Cinderella's room from the wicked stepmother, Lady Tremaine, and freeing Cinderella to try on the glass slipper, which of course fits. While trying to steal the key, Jaq is stuck in Lady Tremaine's pocket and gets knocked around as she pats the key. Gus gets trapped in a tea cup and Lady Tremaine offers some tea to the Duke, with Gus inside. She begins to pour tea into the cup and it drops towards Gus's large belly. Gus sucks in his belly to survive, trembling and sweating, but in a moment the Duke says he wants none, the tea lifts, and Gus is safe (though he gets his butt burnt by the tea later when they get the key). They are last seen in the film in tiny palace uniforms, eating and waving at the wedding of Cinderella and Prince Charming.

In Cinderella II: Dreams Come True, the characters Gus and Jaq were also present, living in the castle along with all the other mice. It was Gus' idea to make the new book of stories to replace the old one. In Cinderella's Story, Jaq and Gus helped Cinderella to prepare for the ball and gave her support when she doubted her abilities. In Jaq's Story, Jaq, feeling useless, wishes that he were a human; Fairy Godmother grants this wish and Jaq tries to help Cinderella and the others prepare for the fair until he realizes he liked being a mouse better and returns to normal. In Anastasia's Story, they attempt to help their old nemesis Lucifer win the affections of a snobby female cat named Pom Pom (the mice's, and probably Bruno's, new nemesis) in the castle in the hopes the cats will then leave the mice alone.

In Cinderella III: A Twist in Time, Gus and Jaq make their opening appearance helping the fairy godmother prepare for the prince and Cinderella's anniversary party. After Lady Tremaine reversed time and made the slipper fit Anastasia's foot, they helped Cinderella search for the prince, (wreaking havoc in the palace kitchen in the process). They discover Lady Tremaine's use of dark magic by witnessing her cast a spell on the prince to forget Cinderella (and think that he danced with Anastasia). In a plan to steal the wand back, they succeed in taking the wand from Lady Tremaine, but she has Cinderella arrested with a banishment sentence before she can lift the spell on the prince. Gus and Jaq manage to convince the prince that Cinderella is the right girl through a catchy showtune, "At the Ball". They later help Cinderella put on her wedding gown, but the three are magically sent away by Lady Tremaine, who assigns Lucifer the cat to drive them in a pumpkin carriage over a cliff. After they narrowly escape their deaths, Cinderella, Jaq, and Gus return to the palace where the mice attack the entrance guards to let Cinderella through to the wedding. The mice are last seen in Cinderella III during the closing credits in a picture with a very decorated king, one with them stuffed with cheese, Gus in a rather sophisticated uniform, and the final picture in a photo booth style series with Cinderella, the prince, and the two mice.

Jaq and Gus also appeared in the Grandma Duck comics in Walt Disney's Comics and Stories where they live with Grandma Duck and her grandnephew Gus Goose. At some time before then, they crossed paths with Donald Duck and Daisy Duck. They appeared in one Mickey Mouse comic strip adventure titled Mousepotamia where they appear to be the same size as Mickey rather than standard mouse size.

Jaq appears in Kingdom Hearts Birth by Sleep for the PSP, and was one of the first new confirmed characters, while Gus is absent. He finds Ventus, shrunk down to 3 in (10 cm) by the Fairy Godmother, placed in a mousetrap, and helps free him, marking the beginning of their friendship. Ventus later helps him gather the necessary materials for Cinderella's dress, and despite a fight between Ventus and Lucifer, they succeed. Later on, while Cinderella is locked in her room by Lady Tremaine, Jaq attempts to get the key to her room up the stairs and is protected by Aqua when the Unversed ambush him. Jaq succeeds and the slipper fits Cinderella perfectly. In the original film they were both voiced by Jimmy MacDonald; in the sequels, Jaq is voiced by Rob Paulsen and Gus is voiced by Corey Burton.

In the 2015 remake, Jaq is changed to a doe (female mouse) named Jacqueline; Gus remains male but is referred to as Gus-Gus.

In Once Upon a Time, Billy the mechanic (Jarod Joseph) is revealed in the second-season episode "Child of the Moon" to be a mouse called Gus. Shortly thereafter, he is murdered by D.A. Albert Spencer/King George (Alan Dale) intending to frame someone. He appears in six episodes of the series, and is killed in his fourth appearance, the others being flashbacks.

Lady Tremaine

Lady Tremaine (also known as the Wicked Stepmother or Cinderella's stepmother) is the main villainess of the franchise. She is based on the original character from the Cinderella fairy tale created by Charles Perrault. She has been portrayed by Cate Blanchett and Gabrielle Anwar and voiced by Eleanor Audley and Susanne Blakeslee.

A cruel, cold, unsympathetic, and calculating tyrant, Lady Tremaine wants nothing more than her daughters to succeed. Unlike most Disney villains, who sport fiery personalities and desire power and the spotlight, she possesses a more cunning, subtle, passive-aggressive personality with a shrewd intelligence and ability for manipulation, particularly towards her daughters. She rarely yells, speaking in a calm, collected voice, even when angered. She wishes her daughters to succeed so that she may reap the benefits when it best suits her.

She marries Cinderella's father for his money and after he passes away, she reveals her true motives of treating Cinderella like a scullery maid while devoting all her time and love to her own two daughters, Anastasia and Drizella.

Anastasia Tremaine
 

Anastasia Tremaine is the redheaded younger daughter of Lady Tremaine. Though following the original story's depiction of the ugly and cruel stepsister in the first film, Anastasia becomes a more sympathetic character in later Disney sequels, depicted as struggling to find genuine love and follow her conscience despite her mother and sister's negative influence and scheming. Pat Williams, James Denney, and Jim Denney report that actress "Lucille Bliss was the voice of Cinderella's stepsister, Anastasia, an experience that remains one of her fondest memories." The actress explains, "I was just a teenager when I got the part...I read that Walt had personally selected me for the part of Anastasia."

In Cinderella, Anastasia is demanding and whiny, but not as bad as Drizella. Anastasia also has enormous feet. During their music lesson, Anastasia plays the flute as Drizella sings but in the sequels she has a beautiful singing voice. Anastasia quarrels with her sister often, though they are united in their jealousy of and contempt for Cinderella. Anastasia's most common dress attire is a pink dress with fuchsia bodice with a lighter pink skirt and fuchsia slippers which she wears with  white collar and petticoat. and a sunny colored hairbow and wears pink bloomers underneath. Her hair is tied to ringlet curls longer than Drizella's, flowing on her shoulders. Her ball dress is lavender and has a purple bustle, a violet bodice, choker and slippers  and wears a green feather on her head instead of her gold headpiece and her curls are shorter than before. However, unlike Drizella, Anastasia's hair style changes throughout the film. In the very beginning, her hair is much shorter and the ringlets are tied back behind her head. When she sleeps and is preparing for the ball, Anastasia's hair is put into a bun. During the first film, she was portrayed as physically ugly, however in the sequels, she blossomed into a more beautiful young woman as her inner goodness developed.

In Cinderella II, Anastasia is portrayed as a more sympathetic character, following the latter-day tradition of setting a stepsister on a redemptive path. She falls in love with a working-class baker and wants to get close to him, but her mother refuses to allow her to because of her own prejudices towards the baker's social standing. Cinderella reassures Anastasia that the baker is a good man, regardless of what Lady Tremaine thinks, and encourages Anastasia to follow her heart. With the help of Cinderella, Anastasia gets a make-over and becomes more beautiful, although her new looks never approach the same level as Cinderella. With help from Cinderella and her animal friends, Anastasia and the baker are reunited and reconciled, with Anastasia standing up to her mother in the process. They attend Cinderella's ball together, where Anastasia thanks her for her help.

In Cinderella III: A Twist in Time, Anastasia is shown not only to have compassion for Cinderella, but to also have a conscience (while Cinderella is also shown to have compassion for Anastasia in spite of her mistreatment). She unintentionally gains access to Cinderella's fairy godmother's wand, which sets in motion her mother's nefarious plot to destroy Cinderella's "happily ever after" and gain access to an opulent lifestyle at the palace. As she is manipulated and forced into marrying the Prince as a means to fulfil her mother and sister's selfish desires, Anastasia begins to feel remorse and guilt. At the altar, realizing she does not truly love the Prince and having understood what true love really means after talking with the King, Anastasia's conscience finally gets the better of her, and to Cinderella's amazement, she refuses to marry the Prince and steps aside for Cinderella. After a tense standoff with Lady Tremaine and Drizella, where Cinderella and the Prince protect Anastasia for her honesty, and the two evil ladies are  turned in toads after the spell goes against them, Anastasia acquires the wand, sets everything right and repairs her relationship with Cinderella, who subsequently invites her to stay in the castle to be her lady-in-waiting which she happily accepts. This repentant act saves her from the punishment that is seen to befall her mother and sister as Cinderella believes that Anastasia had only mistreated her since the death of her father, because Anastasia was also emotionally abused and manipulated into doing so by Lady Tremaine and she truly still had a kind heart in spite of her mother's influence; at the close of the film, they have been reduced to working as servants at the palace. During the credits, a picture shows Anastasia sitting in the palace garden while gazing happily at the baker with whom she fell in love in the second film.

Over the films she gradually becomes less 'ugly' and more snub-nosed, chubby-faced, 'sweet', although never approaching Cinderella's beauty, becoming 'plain' instead of downright 'ugly'. This is partly because she smiles more and partly due to the animators' efforts.

Variety asserts that "stepsister Anastasia is appreciably more sympathetic" in Cinderella III.  At Walt Disney World during the Cinderella's Gala Feast attraction, Julie and Mike Neal declare that "everyone will love Anastasia and Drizella, Cinderella's evil stepsisters, who wander the room with Lady Tremaine..."

She appears in Kingdom Hearts: Birth by Sleep in her homeworld, Castle of Dreams, with her family, playing out the same role as in the original film, except for the strong darkness in her heart nearly causing her to sadistically murder Cinderella before the Cursed Coach drops a bomb on her and her blood family, destroying their bodies and causing them to become Heartless. Unlike in the films, Anastasia is portrayed as a sociopath with no redeeming traits, and is described by the Fairy Godmother as pure evil and a demon.

A 2015 live-action version of Cinderella featured Anastasia in the same role as the classic story portrayed by Holliday Grainger. Like her mother and sister at the end of the film, she left the kingdom with the Grand Duke never to return.

Drizella Tremaine
 

Drizella Tremaine is the brown-haired older daughter of Lady Tremaine. Drizella appears in various novels and other publications.

Drizella's common dress is a sunny yellow dress with a pale-yellow bodice and slippers and has centre-parted hair ending in short sausage curls on the back, and a bright blue bow in her hair. For the palace ball, she wears a pale green gown with aqua bustle, pale green sleeves, and a jade green bodice, choker, and slippers and a second jade green bustle under the aqua one and wears a turquoise feather instead of a bow in her hair. In her second movie, her ribbon changes to pale blue. After her downfall she is reduced to wearing a maid servant's frock. In live appearances, and in many book illustrations, Drizella wears a dress similar to that shown for the palace ball in the first film and wears green slippers and green bloomers underneath. Like her sister, Drizella has enormous feet.

She is portrayed as haughty, abusive, and sadistically cruel. She sets so many bad examples of spitefulness towards Cinderella for her younger sister to follow, that between them Anastasia's the better of the two. Highly unorganized, and, in the Kingdom Hearts series, murderous and sociopathic, she is contemptuously envious of Cinderella's success and beauty and often gets her into trouble. Unlike her younger sister Anastasia, who changes her spiteful ways and develops into a kind and good-natured woman, Drizella remains mean-spirited and cruel, and never overcomes her hatred of Cinderella. She is also depicted as having slovenly eating habits in the third movie, where she samples the food and the wedding cake being prepared for her sister's wedding by shoving handfuls of it into her face and eating them noisily. In the sequels, though not in the original film, Drizella is essentially a younger version of her mother.

Drizella and her mother constantly plot to ruin Cinderella's life and have no qualms about hurting her feelings. Lady Tremaine is well aware of her older daughter's harsh and cold-hearted – and even violent – mannerisms, and can trigger Drizella's anger with a mere handful of casually delivered words. In a particularly distressing scene in the original film, as Lady Tremaine and her daughters prepare to leave for the Prince's ball, Cinderella appears wearing her beautiful homemade gown. Lady Tremaine notes that Cinderella is wearing beads that belonged to Drizella, who rejected them on the claims she was sick of the sight of them. After Lady Tremaine casually points out to Drizella that the beads add a charming touch to the dress, Drizella flies into a rage and violently yanks the beads from Cinderella's neck, and along with Anastasia, lunges upon her stepsister and tears her gown to rags, leaving Cinderella devastated.

Later on throughout the series, Drizella turns on Anastasia and torments her, being able to physically intimidate her. Although she seems to be awed by her during the story An Uncommon Romance, after Anastasia openly rebelled against their overbearing mother and told her she was in love with a baker of low-birth and that she was happier with him than she would ever be with the wealthy suitor Lady Tremaine had hoped she would encounter at another palace ball. Angered, Lady Tremaine stormed off, leaving Drizella stunned, though she sided with her mother and returned home with her.

Unlike Anastasia, who eventually liberates herself from her mother's domination, Drizella obeys her mother's every order and schemes with her to undermine her hated stepsister, Cinderella, though they are foiled by Anastasia and as punishment, they are removed of their wealth and status and are reduced to working as scullery maids in Cinderella's palace.

Like her mother and sister, she appears in Kingdom Hearts: Birth by Sleep, playing the same role as in the original film. However, unlike in the films, she's a sadistic and demonic sociopath and is willing to murder Cinderella to prevent her from ever getting her happiness, and nearly succeeds with the Cursed Coach. However, Aqua manages to save her, and Drizella is hit by a firebomb alongside her mother and sister, causing their eternal plunge into the Realm of Darkness as powerful Heartless, a fate later shared with Mother Gothel and Prince Hans.

She was voiced by Rhoda Williams in the original film and by Russi Taylor in the sequels. Since Taylor's death, she is now voiced by Kat Cressida.

In the 2015 live-action version of Cinderella, the "z" in Drizella was replaced by an "s" to reflect the British stereotype and she was portrayed by Sophie McShera. Like her mother and sister at the end of the film, Drizella left the kingdom with the Grand Duke never to return.

While Drizella does not appear in Descendants 2, the film does feature her daughter Dizzy who is a hairstylist on the Isle of the Lost who helps Mal regain her signature purple hair when she leaves Auradon. After the threat posed by Uma has been dealt with, Evie and Mal ask that Dizzy be the next "villain kid" to be released from the Isle, with Dizzy expressing great enthusiasm for the offer.

Prince Charming

Prince Charming is Cinderella's love interest. He is a dark-haired and tall young man. In the first film, he has no given name. Cinderella's prince is never actually identified in the film as "Prince Charming", nor is there any clear reason why he has come to be known by that title in the Disney vernacular. The only media where he is referred to as "Prince Charming" as of today is Kingdom Hearts Birth by Sleep and the attraction Prince Charming Regal Carrousel.

Determined to see grandchildren, the King organizes a ball for Prince Charming in an effort to cause his son to fall in love and marry, with every eligible maiden in the kingdom ordered to attend. At the ball, Prince Charming rejects every girl, until he sees Cinderella, with whom he is immediately smitten in love. The two dance throughout the castle grounds until the clock starts to chime midnight and Cinderella flees away from the castle, accidentally dropping one of her glass slippers. Prince Charming picks up the glass slipper and the next day a royal proclamation is issued, stating the Grand Duke will visit every house in the kingdom to find the girl who fits the glass slipper, so that she can be married to Prince Charming. After the slipper perfectly fits onto Cinderella's foot, Prince Charming marries her.

Prince Charming has little involvement in the sequel, Cinderella II: Dreams Come True. In the third film, Cinderella III: A Twist in Time, while Prince Charming and Cinderella are celebrating the first anniversary of their wedding, Lady Tremaine gets possession of the Fairy Godmother's wand and reverses time, going back to the moment of the Duke's arrival at her manor with the glass slipper. Lady Tremaine then uses the wand to fit the slipper onto Anastasia's foot and make her marry Prince Charming. When he sees Anastasia, he is about to dismiss but Lady Tremaine uses the wand to make him forget about Cinderella completely and to marry Anastasia. Cinderella is later caught trying to get the wand from her stepmother, but she manages to touch Prince Charming's hand, and the connection they both feel confuses him. Prince Charming is then addressed by Gus and Jaq who confront him with their side of the story, using the other mended glass slipper as evidence. Prince Charming, although he still cannot remember her, believes the mice's tale and sets out to retrieve Cinderella before she sails off under Lady Tremaine's orders. The two lovers are reunited and get prepared for the wedding, but Lady Tremaine makes Anastasia to look exactly like Cinderella to take the real Cinderella's place during the wedding. When Anastasia hesitates during the wedding and says "I don't", Lady Tremaine aims the wand at both Cinderella and Anastasia. However, Prince Charming manages to step between them and blocks the magic with his sword, causing it to bounce back and transform Lady Tremaine and Drizella into toads. Prince Charming and Cinderella stay in this new timeline and get married again.

He appears in Kingdom Hearts: Birth by Sleep along with his homeworld, playing out the same role as in the film. Just after Cinderella flees the ball, he briefly mistakes Aqua for Cinderella. In a scene which was originally intended for the film but deleted, Prince Charming and Cinderella are reunited after the slipper fits Cinderella's foot perfectly, and he embraces her lovingly. In the original film, his speaking is provided by William Phipps while his singing is provided by Mike Douglas. He is later voiced by Christopher Daniel Barnes in the sequels.

The animated movies never made mention of his real name. An official advertisement from Disney France said "The Prince's name is Henry".

In the 2015 live-action film, the prince was named Kit (a diminutive form of either Christopher or Christian) and portrayed by Richard Madden. In the film, Prince Kit and Cinderella first met in the woods during a deer hunt without knowing each other's true identity and took a liking to each other with Cinderella believing that Kit is an apprentice training under his father without recognizing him as the prince. The desire to see Cinderella again was what caused Prince Kit to open the ball to commoners, Cinderella attending to find him rather than to meet the prince (not knowing they are the same person). Prince Kit also became king in the last third of the film after his father died from illness.

Lucifer

Lucifer is the Tremaines' pet cat and the third antagonist of the franchise. Tonally, his existence can be justified to provide a sinister and scheming opposing counterpart to Cinderella's loyal and good-natured pet dog Bruno as well as the birds and mice who are supportive and loving friends and allies of Cinderella. He has black fur and is depicted as a sly, wicked, and manipulative mouse consumer. In a particularly conniving scene in the beginning of the original film, Lucifer tries to rid the château's pet dog Bruno outside of the kitchen Lucifer is consuming his breakfast bowl of milk in, by scratching him painfully and slyly while Cinderella's back is momentarily turned away. Bruno then growls loudly and threateningly out of infuriation and pain, and Lucifer lets out a benign and exaggerated fake shriek of pain, as if Bruno scratched him. Cinderella hears Lucifer's whining fake screech and blames Bruno, bitterly scolding him to go outside and to stop misbehaving, reasoning "we have to at least try, to get along together". Back inside the kitchen, Lucifer wears a mischievous grin of wicked satisfaction, lazily licking his milk bowl, while Cinderella reprimands him with scorn and annoyance "and that includes you too, your majesty!". He becomes very focused on catching the mice when provoked, but his attempts to catch them always end in a comical failure. First, in the first movie, that also the main antagonist, Jaq bravely makes a distraction to lure Lucifer away from the other mice's path to getting their breakfast. While returning with the mice, Gus struggles with carrying his load and easily grabs Lucifer's attention. Fortunately, and unexpectedly, Cinderella enters the room and accidentally takes Gus away on her breakfast serving platters for Lady Tremaine and her daughters. Tremaine's youngest daughter, Anastasia, is the dubious recipient of Gus, for the teacup he was hiding under was the one Cinderella served her. Lucifer knowingly puts his ear against all three of their closed doors to decipher Gus' location, and races over in delight to Anastasia's once he hears her scream of horror upon discovering the poor, frightened little mouse in her tea. Anastasia continues to scream wildly upon hastily accusing Cinderella of the perceived sabotage, and in severe distress and anguish, immediately notifies her mother, inciting an enormous frenzy, whereupon Cinderella is summoned to her stepmother's bedroom for a private talk. Lucifer slips into the room as well for a brief grooming by his malevolent owner, before she reprimands her stepdaughter with frigid ferocity. At the conclusion of this degrading and abusive private talk, after sadistically rattling off an inordinately long list of chores that Lady Tremaine is forcing Cinderella to complete, in a moment of amusing comical tongue-in-cheek, the wicked stepmother muses "and one more thing: see that Lucifer gets his "bath" at which the ears of the evil feline shoot straight up in horror, and he snarls at his owners quarrelsome request with repugnant disdain, which suggests that he dislikes baths or prefers to remain filthy.

Lucifer's next appearance in the film is when he encounters Jaq and Gus as they attempt to retrieve a sash and necklace of beads from a laundry pile, as part of making Cinderella's dress for the ball. At the start of the scene, Jaq and Gus assume they are alone and approach the sash, initially unaware that a slumbering Lucifer is lying on top of an ottoman directly above them. Once they realize that they are in fact not alone, they attempt to sneak past their foe while carrying the sash. Unfortunately, Lucifer's impeccable hearing ability picks up suspicious movement nearby and awakes, confused and a bit cranky. Jaq and Gus' cover is eventually blown, yet they still manage to slip the sash into their mouse hole, partly thanks to Lucifer's clumsiness. With the sash successfully obtained, Jaq and Gus shift their focus towards the bead necklace. Overcome with excitement, Gus blurts out the duo's desire to take the beads along with the sash. Determined not to fail this time around, Lucifer spots the necklace and immediately sits on it, awaiting the mice's next move. Now faced with an inevitable detour, Jaq formulates a plan, much to Gus' delight and Lucifer's suspicion. Jaq then fully exposes himself and starts casually walking in Lucifer's direction. Pleased with what he thinks is a surrender, Lucifer readies his paws and prepares for his pounce, unknowingly letting Jaq sneak directly behind him. His focus is then interrupted when he turns and is shocked to hear Jaq, now amidst the laundry pile at the other side of the room, humming to himself and biting off buttons of an overcoat. Jaq does so in the hopes of luring Lucifer away from the beads, thus giving Gus time to grab them and escape. Lucifer eventually catches on to this, and initially has trouble deciding on whether he should pursue Jaq or protect the necklace from Gus, standing by at the mouse hole. Lucifer ultimately figures out a way to accomplish both tasks and uses his tail to keep the necklace close to him as he moves towards Jaq. By the time Lucifer reaches Jaq, the witty little mouse launches a button that does no more than leave an imprint on the annoyed feline's nose. Shifting his attention completely on Jaq, Lucifer pounces on the pest and chases him into the heap of laundry, mainly into a light-blue nightgown. Finally sensing an opening, Gus makes his way to the necklace and struggles to get a grip on it. After a few more seconds of chasing, Lucifer temporarily emerges from the gown and examines it, attempting to get a better idea of where Jaq might be. Ironically, Jaq has hid himself in Lucifer's thick fur atop his head, using this pause to check on Gus. The portly mouse seems to be successfully making his way back to the mouse hole, but then suddenly slips on a bead, loses his footing, and slams into the far side wall, breaking the necklace into its several beads. Lucifer's attention briefly turns to the sudden disturbance, only to have Jaq intervene by keeping his eyes closed. Lucifer then tries to grab the intruder on his head, learns that the intruder was Jaq, and ultimately chases him back into the nightgown again. During this struggle, Gus begins picking up the beads, one by one, and placing them into his hat. The struggle in the laundry pile reaches its end, this time by Jaq making an escape out of one of the nightgown's sleeves, with Lucifer close behind. Being evidently far too large for such a small exit, the cat only manages to poke his head out of the sleeve, as Jaq rushes to Gus' aid. Enraged by the trap he has been put in, Lucifer uses all the limited mobility he has and slithers across the floor towards the mice. Jaq tries speeding up the process of picking up the beads by stringing them to Gus' tail, hoping to gather them all before time runs out. Gus barely manages to grab the last bead before Lucifer reaches him and attempts to bite on him. The two mice narrowly escape back through the mouse hole, leaving Lucifer temporarily trapped in the nightgown, dazed and confused after slamming his face against the now closed hole as part of an unsuccessful last pounce.

At the film's climax, he attempts to catch Jaq and Gus while they try to free Cinderella from her locked room, but Cinderella's dog Bruno (a friend of the mice and enemy to Lucifer) intervenes and scares Lucifer so much that he jumps out of the tower's window. This is the last see of Lucifer in the film, but the sequels reveal that he survived the fall due to cats always landing on their feet.

A brown fat cat resembling Lucifer makes a cameo at one scene of the one-shot featurette Ben and Me, chasing Christopher Mouse.

Lucifer appears in the two sequels. In Cinderella II: Dreams Come True, the second film. He only appears in the third and final segment, An Uncommon Romance where he falls in love with the snobby palace cat Pom Pom to the point that he makes a deal with the mice never to chase them again if they help him reconcile with Pom Pom. The plan works, but Pom Pom goads Lucifer into helping her catch and eat the mice. His treachery backfires and Pom Pom dumps him.

In Cinderella III: A Twist in Time, the third film, after Lady Tremaine reverses time with the Fairy Godmother's wand, Lucifer resumes his role as adversary to both Cinderella and the mice. In his most notable scene, Lady Tremaine turns him into a human coachman to take Cinderella and the mice as far away from the palace as he can, but during the chase, Lucifer falls off the coach into a small pond, where he turns back into a cat and is left stranded in the woods.

Lucifer appears in Kingdom Hearts Birth by Sleep as a boss character in Ven's scenario in which he attempts to stop Jaq and Ventus from gathering the necessary materials for Cinderella's dress. Despite having been shrunk to the size of a mouse, Ventus valiantly engages Lucifer in a brutal battle which Ventus wins. Frightened, Lucifer runs off.

His vocal effects are provided by June Foray in the original film and "Ben and Me" and by Frank Welker in its sequels.

The Fairy Godmother

The Fairy Godmother first appears in the film after Cinderella's stepsisters tear her gown to shreds before Prince Charming's ball. She appears in the garden, and greatly transforms her appearance for the ball with a magic spell. She transforms the mice into stallions, Bruno the dog into a footman, Major the horse into a coachman, a pumpkin into a white coach, and transforms her torn dress into a beautiful silvery-blue dress with comfortable glass slippers. Cinderella departs for the ball after the Fairy Godmother warns her that the spell will expire at the stroke of midnight. With her work done, she vanishes into thin air.

Cinderella II: Dreams Come True begins with the Fairy Godmother reading the story of Cinderella to the animals until Gus and Jaq arrive. The three of them set off to make a new book to narrate what happens after the "Happily Ever After" by stringing the three segments of the film together into one narrative. During one of the segments, the Fairy Godmother turns Jaq into a human six times taller than his height so that he can help Cinderella in the palace.

In Cinderella III: A Twist in Time, the Fairy Godmother's powerful magic wand is stolen by Anastasia, who accidentally turns her into a stone statue, and her wand is misused by the venomously evil Lady Termaine. The Fairy Godmother is turned back to her normal form at the end of the film. She offers to return Cinderella and Prince Charming to their former lives, but realizes their love has grown stronger than it was in the original timeline and so chooses instead to let them continue on from here.

The Fairy Godmother also appears in the Kingdom Hearts series. After the destruction of her world, Castle of Dreams, by Maleficent, she manages to safely escape. She lives in Traverse Town with Merlin, and every time Sora gives her summon gem, she restores that being's spirit, allowing Sora to summon them in battle. She eventually gives Donald Duck the Lord Fortune staff. She also appears in Kingdom Hearts Birth by Sleep in her own world, reprising the same role as in the film and also shrinking Ventus and Aqua to the size of mice in order to avoid Lady Tremaine spotting them. She also makes a brief appearance in the Re Mind DLC of Kingdom Hearts III where she appears in Radiant Garden, having been asked by Merlin and Yen Sid to assist in the search for Sora by looking into Riku's dreams.

The Fairy Godmother is one of the many guests in Disney's House of Mouse. She also is the host in the Magic, Music and Mayhem live show. She was voiced by Verna Felton in the first film and its sequels voiced by Russi Taylor. Due to Russi Taylor's death way back in 2019, Grey DeLisle took over the voice of The Fairy Godmother appeared in a cameo appearance in Disney+ series, The Wonderful World of Mickey Mouse.

In Italian dub the fairy is called Smemorina, for the scene in first film where she didn't find her magic wand.

She is portrayed by Helena Bonham Carter in the 2015 remake live-action version of the original Disney movie, and also serves as the narrator of the story. As well as casting the spells to create Cinderella's coach, gown, and slippers, she also casts a quick spell to prevent Cinderella's step-family from recognizing her at the ball. Though Lady Tremaine would somehow find out she was there.

Minor characters
The King is Prince Charming's father who desperately wants his son to marry and have children because he wants to see his grandchildren before he dies as shown in the first film. In the second film, he appears a few times in the first and second segments. In the third film, he reveals to Anastasia that his deceased queen (who is only seen in paintings) was not a good dancer and gives the stepsister his most precious possession: the seashell that he and the queen touched together for the first time. He was voiced by Luis Van Rooten in the first film and by Andre Stojka in the sequels. Derek Jacobi played the character in the 2015 live-action film, where he becomes ill and dies in the movie, although he has a brief conversation with Cinderella at the ball that inspires him to accept her as Kit's wife despite his initial plans for Kit to marry a real princess.
The Grand Duke is The King's right-hand man who organizes the ball for Prince Charming to find him a wife. He later visits the Tremaine manor to find the glass slipper's owner. He appears a few times in the second film, more than the King. In the third film, the Grand Duke is responsible for organizing the wedding between Prince Charming and Anastasia. The Grand Duke also appears in Kingdom Hearts Birth by Sleep, playing out the same role as in the film with some differences. He was voiced by Luis Van Rooten (who also voiced the King in the original film) in the first film and by Rob Paulsen in the sequels. Stellan Skarsgård plays him in the 2015 live-action film, in which, unlike in the original film, he plays a more antagonistic role by conspiring with Cinderella's evil stepmother Lady Tremaine. By the end of the film, the Grand Duke alongside Lady Tremaine and her family leave the kingdom never to return.
Bruno is a Bloodhound who is Cinderella's pet dog, a friend of the mice, and enemy to Lucifer. He is transformed into a footman by the Fairy Godmother so that Cinderella can attend the ball in the first film. Bruno plays an important role in foiling Lucifer at the climax of the first film that allows Jaq to save Gus and foil Lady Tremaine. He appears again in the second film, having moved to the palace with Cinderella and her mice friends. He does not appear in the third film. His vocal effects were provided by Jimmy MacDonald and Earl Keen in the first film and by Frank Welker in the second film.
Major is a horse that lives with Cinderella (in the first film) and friend of the mice. He is transformed into a coachman by the Fairy Godmother so that Cinderella can attend the ball in the first film.
A couple of Birds are part of Cinderella's animal friends. They help the mice by preparing Cinderella's dress for the ball. In the climax of the film they go in search of Bruno to help rescue Cinderella after being locked up by Lady Tremaine.
Cinderella's Father is the deceased father of Cinderella, husband of Lady Tremaine, and step-father of Anastasia and Drizella. He loved his daughter very much and gave her countless luxuries and comfort. Following the death of his first wife, he remarries Lady Tremaine, in the hopes of giving his daughter a mother's care. Unfortunately, he dies mysteriously and suddenly shortly afterwords, which soon leads to his daughter's mistreatment by his new wife and stepdaughters. Ben Chaplin plays him in the 2015 live-action film.

Introduced in Cinderella II: Dreams Come True
Prudence (voiced by Holland Taylor in both sequels) is a stern and snobbish woman who is in charge of the palace banquets and parties. She wears a dark-grey dress, and keeps her dark auburn hair in a tight bun. Cinderella helps change Prudence's view on things through her improvements to the ball; she comes to trust Cinderella's judgement as the King loves the changes. At one point, she ultimately falls in love with the Grand Duke and they dance together. Her name is a pun about her behavior.
Beatrice and Daphne are two kind, understanding and helpful female palace servants help Cinderella caringly with her royal-ball preparation duties, in the first segment that appears in the second film, Cinderella II: Dreams Come True. They try to comfort Cinderella, amidst the stuck-up, arrogant whims of the insufferably overbearing, burdensome, and bland Prudence, the female head servant. Beatrice is a tall, thin women with chocolate-brown eyes, who wears a blue dress, and keeps her light blonde hair in a tight bun. Daphne is shorter and stubbier with bright blue eyes, clad in a rose-pink dress, and also keeps her dark brown hair in a bun. Russi Taylor voices both characters.
Mary is a female mouse who appears in the second film, she is a close friend to Jaq and Gus and has feelings for Jaq.
Pom-Pom is a white female cat. She becomes the new nemesis of the mice within the palace after they moved into it. Appears in the second film. In the third segment, Lucifer falls in love with her, but she shows no interest in him. With help from Jaq and the other mice, Lucifer manages to win Pom-Pom's love. After that, she notices the mice and teams up with Lucifer to eat them, the mice panic and run around the room trying to escape from the cats, Pom-Pom catches one and is about to eat him when she gets soaked by water from a jug. Blaming this on Lucifer, she drops the bouquet of fish on Lucifer (who had given it to her) and walks off, not wanting anything to do with him. Her vocal effects were provided by Frank Welker in the second film.
The Baker (voiced by Rob Paulsen) appears in the second film. Anastasia meets him by chance in his bakery shop and they are both soon swept off each other's feet. However, Lady Tremaine and Drizella disapprove of Anastasia's mutual romantic feeling for the baker, with Lady Tremaine saying the Baker and his shop are unworthy, and she forbids Anastasia from speaking to him. After Cinderella's failed attempt to get Anastasia and the Baker together, the mice (including Jaq and Gus), the birds and Cinderella decide to help Anastasia see the Baker again. Once Anastasia is ready to go to Cinderella's ball with him, she notices him with another lady and runs away crying. The baker finds her, but Lady Tremaine and Drizella find them together again. Lady Tremaine again tries to take Anastasia away, but she stands up to her mother, saying she will go with the baker to the ball. After this, her mother and elder sister leave. Later that night, Anastasia attends the ball and dances with the baker. He later makes a cameo appearance in the end credits of the third film, shown in a painting with Anastasia.

Appearing in Cinderella (2015 film)
Cinderella's Mother (portrayed by Hayley Atwell) She is Cinderella's biological mother, who died when her daughter was ten years old. She is where Cinderella inherited her kindness, grace, and beauty from. From a young age, she taught Cinderella to always be kind to others and even animals, and to believe in the existence of magic and fairy godmothers. However, she becomes gravely ill soon after the film begins. As she lies on her deathbed, she makes her daughter promise to have courage and be kind, for it will see her through all the trials life could offer her.
Mr. Goosey Goose is a goose lives with Cinderella on the farm with other animals in 2015 live-action film. Gareth Mason plays in his coachman form. He is transformed into a coachman by the Fairy Godmother so that Cinderella can attend the ball. Mr. Goose takes the place of Major the horse in the remake of the film as a coachman.
The Lizards are two pair little green lizards lives in Cinderella's garden. One of the lizard call Mr. Lizard plays by Tom Eden in the 2015 live-action film, in which they played a minor role for they transformed into two footmen by Fairy Godmother for take Cinderella to the ball. Mr. Lizard tells Cinderella that he's only a lizard not a footman and also tells her to enjoy while it lasts. After Ella leaves the palace in a rush, the scheming Grand Duke and the Captain of the Guards give chase. During the chase, one of the footmen (who at this point got back their tails) uses his tail to flip a switch which closed a cast iron gate and stopped the Duke from chasing them. The lizards are seen again at the end of the film where they are seen scurrying around the palace balcony (along with the four mice and Mr. Goose) when Ella and Kit are married as they address the public on a balcony. The Lizards replace Bruno the Bloodhound in the remake as the footmen.
The Captain (portrayed by Nonso Anozie) is a character from the 2015 live-action Cinderella film who is loyal to Kit and his father.
Sir Francis Tremaine was the first husband of Lady Tremaine, and father of Anastasia and Drizella. He is only mentioned in the film. He died and the cause of his death was not known.

References

Characters
Cinderella
List of Cinderella